Delta Herculis (δ Herculis, abbreviated Delta Her, δ Her) is a multiple star system in the constellation of Hercules. Its light produces to us apparent magnitude 3.12, as such the third-brightest star in the large, fairly dim constellation.

Components
It consists of a binary pair, designated Delta Herculis A, together with three potential companions, suffixed B, C and D. Furthermore B is believed to be an optical binary. A's components are designated Delta Herculis Aa (officially named Sarin , the traditional name of the system) and Ab.
The angular separation between the main component A and the component B, which has a magnitude of 8.74, is 8.5 arcseconds .

Nomenclature

δ Herculis (Latinised to Delta Herculis) is the system's Bayer designation. The designations of the four constituents as Delta Herculis A, B, C and D, and those of A's components - Delta Herculis Aa and Ab - derive from the convention used by the Washington Multiplicity Catalog (WMC) for multiple star systems, and adopted by the International Astronomical Union (IAU).

It bore the traditional name Sarin. In 2016, the International Astronomical Union organized a Working Group on Star Names (WGSN) to catalogue and standardize proper names for stars. The WGSN decided to attribute proper names to individual stars rather than entire multiple systems. It approved the name Sarin for the component Delta Herculis Aa on 12 September 2016 and it is now so included in the List of IAU-approved Star Names.

In the catalogue of stars in the Calendarium of Al Achsasi al Mouakket, this star was designated Menkib al Jathi al Aisr, which was translated into Latin as Humerus Sinister Ingeniculi, meaning kneeler's left shoulder.

Properties 

Delta Herculis A presents as an A-type main-sequence subgiant with a stellar classification of A3IV. It has both a mass and radius that are roughly two times solar yielding a total luminosity of about

See also
Lists of stars in the constellation Hercules
Class A Stars

References

External links
Jim Kaler's Stars, University of Illinois: DELTA HER (Delta Herculis)
An Atlas of the Universe: Multiple Star Orbits

Hercules (constellation)
Herculis, Delta
Sarin
Herculis, 065
A-type subgiants
084379
6410
156164
Durchmusterung objects